The 1997 Skate America was the first event of six in the 1997–98 ISU Champions Series, a senior-level international invitational competition series. It was held at the Joe Louis Arena in Detroit, Michigan on October 23–25. Medals were awarded in the disciplines of men's singles, ladies' singles, pair skating, and ice dancing. Skaters earned points toward qualifying for the 1997–98 Champions Series Final. The compulsory dance was the Golden Waltz.

Results

Men

Ladies

Pairs

Ice dancing

References
 https://www.nytimes.com/1997/10/26/sports/figure-skating-eldredge-overcomes-injury-to-win-kwan-beats-lipinski.html
 https://www.chicagotribune.com/news/ct-xpm-1997-10-26-9710260146-story,amp.html

External links
 1997 Skate America

Skate America, 1997
Skate America